Hasheh (also Romanized as Ḩasheh and Hashāh) is a village in Rudbar Rural District, in the Central District of Tafresh County, Markazi Province, Iran. At the 2006 census, its population was 38, in 11 families.

References 

Populated places in Tafresh County